Ruurd Gerbens Leegstra (29 June 1877 in Wonokesoemo, Dutch East Indies – 17 January 1933 in Utrecht) was a Dutch rower who competed in the 1900 Summer Olympics.

He was part of the Dutch boat Minerva Amsterdam, which won the bronze medal in the eights.

References

External links

 profile

1877 births
1933 deaths
Dutch male rowers
Olympic rowers of the Netherlands
Rowers at the 1900 Summer Olympics
Olympic bronze medalists for the Netherlands
Olympic medalists in rowing
People from Central Java
Medalists at the 1900 Summer Olympics
Dutch people of the Dutch East Indies